Uncertainty: the Life and Science of Werner Heisenberg is a biography by David C. Cassidy documenting the life and science of Werner Heisenberg, one of the founders of quantum mechanics. The book was published in 1992 by W. H. Freeman and Company while an updated and popularized version was published in 2009 under the title Beyond Uncertainty: Heisenberg, Quantum Physics, and The Bomb. The book is named after the quantum mechanics concept known as Heisenberg's uncertainty principle. It has been reviewed many times and was generally well received.

Background 
Cassidy is a historian of science and an associate professor at Hofstra University who specializes in the history of German science and quantum mechanics. He was previously an associate editor of the reference work Collected Papers of Albert Einstein. For the project, Cassidy was the first to be given access to the Heisenberg family's archives. Cassidy's grandparents died in the Armenian genocide during World War I and in studying the era he wanted, in his own words, to "comprehend the nature of genocide, dictatorship, and the hold of mass persuasion over people’s minds".

Heisenberg was a twentieth-century physicist best known for developing the uncertainty principle of quantum mechanics as well as his role in the German nuclear weapons program during World War II. He received his doctorate degree at 22, just two years prior to his introduction of matrix mechanics. After being appointed professor theoretical physics at the University of Leipzig in 1926, Heisenberg published his uncertainty principle in 1927 and went on to win the 1932 Nobel Prize at the age of 32. The book draws its name from the uncertainty principle, which states that, in quantum mechanics, there exists pairs of quantities, such as position and velocity, in which you cannot know the precise value of both at the same time. Heisenberg was sympathetic to the Third Reich, though he never joined the Nazi Party.

Themes 
In using the term "uncertainty" in the title, the book argues that a loose form of the uncertainty principle applies to Heisenberg's life as a whole. The book focuses largely on Heisenberg's work on the German nuclear weapons program during World War II, a program that would have given Hitler an atom bomb if it had been successful. The book shows that, contrary to the popular myth, there is no evidence Heisenberg ever tried to sabotage or delay the weapons program or otherwise prevent Hitler from obtaining a bomb.

Content 

 Part One: Young Werner

 Part Two: Quantum Mechanics

 Part Three: The Lonely Years

 Part Four: A World at War

Reception 
The book won Cassidy the 1992 Science Writing Award and the 1993 Pfizer Award. It has received many reviews in newspapers, magazines, and academic journals. Along with many others, the book was reviewed by Rudolf Peierls,  Mary Jo Nye, Frederick Charles Frank, John P. van Gigch, and Cathryn Carson. Among newspapers, the book was reviewed in The New York Times, The Los Angeles Times, The Chronicle of Higher Education, Publishers Weekly, and The New York Review of Books. The New York Times Book Review of the work stated that Cassidy "has written a fascinating, well documented biography". The Los Angeles Times book review for the work stated: "This is an important book", due to its exposition on Heisenberg's involvement with the Third Reich.

Among other acclamations, the book was listed in "Books for Vacation Reading" by the New York Times Book Review in May of 1992 and was listed in "Notable Books of the Year 1992" with both recommendations using the byline "A fascinating, well-documented biography of the man who, in his scientific life, concluded that quantum mechanics had destroyed the determinism of classical mechanics and who, in his personal life, seemed to sympathize with the Nazis". The Guardian  put out a list of David Kaiser's "top 10 books about quantum theory" in 2012, which included this volume. At number four on the list, the byline opened: "This life of quantum architect Werner Heisenberg captures the sweep and drama of his early years." The play Copenhagen was initially inspired by this book and Heisenberg's War by Thomas Powers, which has a very different view of Heisenberg's role in the war. Cassidy's book is also frequently mentioned in the postscript to Copenhagen. The book is also the subject of a web exhibit by the American Institute of Physics in the Niels Bohr Library & Archives. It has been recommended in several other works as well.

Journal reviews 
The book was reviewed in Science, Nature, Physics Today,  and many other journals. The book was also reviewed in German in Physik Journal. The book's review in Physics Today stated that the book was "certainly a major contribution to scientific biography" and that it was the first "detailed, comprehensive and scholarly biography of Heisenberg", despite abundant literature on the man and his scientific contributions. The review argued that Cassidy "deserves a great deal of credit" for his discussion of Heisenberg's beliefs and rationalizations that allowed him to work with the Third Reich. It went on to state that Cassidy wrote the book "with an objectivity that at times must have been painful for him" and that it was "a major accomplishment". The book's review in Nature closed with: "Uncertainty is an exquisite book, especially because it neither demonizes nor canonizes a great scientist and troubled man." The book's review in Science closed by stating the book "is a powerful demonstration of the potential of social history in scientific biography."

Analysis 

The New York Times Book Review stated that the book "is best on the historical background, particularly the rise of Nazism in Germany, and Heisenberg's relations with the Nazi Party and with his contemporaries; it is less successful, though, in conveying the beauty of his mathematical physics and the importance of his philosophical ideas." The piece also criticized the book for not including more details on Heisenberg's family life. The review went on to state: "Much of the book is, however, devoted to an objective account of Heisenberg's relations with the Third Reich" and that the "last 32 years of Heisenberg's life are condensed into a short final chapter."

Release details 
  (paperback)
  (hardcover)

See also 
 Atomic Spy
 The End of the Certain World
 Subtle is the Lord

References

Sources 

 
 
 
 
 
 
 

1992 non-fiction books
American biographies
Books about the history of physics
German biographies
Werner Heisenberg